The Division Schnelle Kräfte (Rapid Forces Division) formerly Division Spezielle Operationen (Special Operations Division) is an airborne division of the German Army. Its headquarters staff is based at Stadtallendorf. It was created as 1st Airborne Division (1. Luftlandedivision) in 1956 and reflagged twice in 1994 and 2001 as Airmobile Forces Command/4th Division (Kommando Luftbewegliche Kräfte/4. Division), Special Operations Division and eventually Rapid Forces Division. The division leads three combat brigades and special forces troops, all of which are fully air-mobile. In June 2014, the Dutch 11 Airmobile Brigade was fully integrated into the division as part of the binational military cooperation between Germany and the Netherlands and in 2017 the Romanian 81st Mechanized Brigade followed suit.

History 
Created in 1956, 1st Airborne Division's main tasks were to act as the backbone of counterattacks behind the enemy lines of the Warsaw Pact and to respond to hostile breaks through allied front lines. The very first commanders of this unit were illustrious paratrooper generals such as Bern von Baer and Hans Kroh, both recipients of the Knight's Cross of the Iron Cross. The 1st Airborne Division existed throughout the Cold War and was disbanded in 1994. The capability for air-transportable forces was eventually replaced by Airmobile Forces Command/4th Division, a division-sized formation the duties of which shifted to more complex scenarios of current days.

This happened mainly because of two incidents in 1994 and 1997 where German citizens had to be rescued from Rwanda and Albania, once even by foreign troops as the German military lacked of adequate forces to carry out evacuation operations on their own. One of the three existing brigades (Airborne Brigade 25 "Black Forest") was drawn on to provide the headquarters for the German Army's new special forces unit, the Kommando Spezialkräfte.

The first overseas deployment of this division took place in 1961 when its troops rendered humanitarian assistance to Morocco after a devastating earthquake. From there on 1st Airborne Division or its successors deployed troops to Somalia, Croatia, Albania, Bosnia, Kosovo, Afghanistan and Congo. The paratroopers saw extensive action in Afghanistan. With four of the nation's highest awards for gallantry—among others—having been awarded to its members, the division's Paratrooper Battalion 263 is the most decorated unit of the German Army.

Following the restructuring of the German armed forces, the Special Operations Division was transferred into the new Rapid Forces Division.

In June 2014 the 11 Luchtmobiele Brigade (11th Airmobile Brigade) of the Royal Netherlands Army joined the division. The Dutch forces will remain stationed in the Netherlands but will cooperate in training and exercises of their German counterparts.

Structure 

  Rapid Forces Division (Division Schnelle Kräfte), in Stadtallendorf
  Staff and Signal Company, Rapid Forces Division, in Stadtallendorf
  1st Airborne Brigade (Luftlandebrigade 1), in Saarlouis
  11th Airmobile Brigade (11 Luchtmobiele Brigade), in Schaarsbergen
  Special Forces Command (Kommando Spezialkräfte) (KSK), in Calw
  Helicopter Command (Kommando Hubschrauber), in Bückeburg
  10th Transport Helicopter Regiment (Transporthubschrauberregiment 10), in Faßberg
  30th Transport Helicopter Regiment (Transporthubschrauberregiment 30), in Niederstetten
  36th Attack Helicopter Regiment (Kampfhubschrauberregiment 36), at Fritzlar Air Base
  International Helicopter Training Centre (Internationales Hubschrauberausbildungszentrum), in Bückeburg

Geographic Distribution

References

External links 
 Official Website of the Division Schnelle Kräfte

Airborne divisions of Germany
Divisions of the Bundeswehr
2001 establishments in Germany
German involvement in the Syrian civil war
Military units and formations established in 1956
Military units and formations disestablished in 1994
Military units and formations established in 1994
Military units and formations disestablished in 2001
Military units and formations established in 2001
Special forces of Germany